Greta morgane, the thick-tipped greta, is a day active ithomiine butterfly from the subfamily Ithomiinae. The length of the wings of this clearwing butterfly range from 56 to 58 mm. It is a common butterfly in Mexico, Middle-America, and the Caribbean. It has been recorded in 2004 as a stray in south Texas.

The caterpillar uses plants from the deadly nightshade family (Solanaceae) as hosts. Therefore, the Greta morgane has body fluids which are nauseating for birds, making them unattractive prey.

References

Further reading 
 Lamas, G. (1999). Nymphalidae II Pt. 3 Ithomiinae. In E. Bauer & T. Frankenbach (Eds.), Butterflies of the World. (pp. 1–17). Keltern, Germany: Goecke & Evers.

Ithomiini
Butterflies of Central America
Nymphalidae of South America
Lepidoptera of Colombia
Lepidoptera of Cuba
Butterflies of North America
Butterflies described in 1833